The effects of weather on sport are varied, with some events unable to take place while others are changed considerably. The performance of participants can be reduced or improved, and some sporting world records are invalid if set under certain weather conditions. While outdoor sports are most affected, those played indoors can still be impacted by adverse or advantageous weather conditions.

Temperature
Temperature has a significant impact on the performance of athletes. High temperature can cause various heat illnesses such as heat cramps and heatstroke, while very low temperatures may lead to hypothermia. In cross country skiing world cup, races are cancelled or postponed if the temperature in a major portion of the course is -25°C or lower, while in biathlon the limit is -20°C.

Training regimes may include methods of heat acclimatization, and regulations in some sports stipulate the intensity of some schedules. The National Collegiate Athletic Association (NCAA) in North America requires teams to build up the level of training in hot weather. Such preparation intends to improve performance and reduce the potentially fatal risk of heat stroke.

High temperatures also result in thinner air, which results in less drag on athletes in sports where air resistance plays a major role. Velodrome designers capitalise on this, heating the stadium in the hope of making the cycling faster, and The Daily Telegraph has reported that some Olympic Games organisers have pumped cold air into velodromes to give rival teams a disadvantage in close time trials.

Precipitation

Some sports are cancelled because of precipitation.  Some are deemed too dangerous to play when the ground is damp because of the danger of injury to a player through slipping.

When played professionally, the following sports do not usually take place during any level of precipitation:
Auto racing (NASCAR, IndyCar) (Usually heavy rain or track wetness is needed to delay or cancel a road course race, any kind of participation almost always cancels or delays an Oval track race.)
Baseball
Cricket
Golf
Tennis

When the rain is excessive an event might be canceled because of a waterlogged pitch. Winter sports can sometimes be canceled due to the amount of snow on the ground, be it too little or too much.

Wind

Wind can blow the equipment in a sporting event, changing the direction or travel of a ball.  In golf the wind levels may influence the way a shot is taken.

A headwind can slow runners, while they may gain wind assistance from a tailwind.

Some sports rely on the presence of wind, especially surface water sports.

Visibility
Some sports cannot be played if there is insufficient visibility as it can make them dangerous or can be disadvantageous to a competitor.  Cricket test matches often finish when the umpire decides that the light level is too low and the timing of this can sometimes be controversial.  The difficulties of playing in bad light conditions is also disputed.  Some events are called off when there is heavy fog.

The position of the sun can be a disadvantage to some competitors.  In some circumstances a player may have their vision impaired by the brightness of the sun.

See also
Altitude training and the effects of high altitude on humans
High altitude football controversy
Magnus effect

References

Inclement weather management